Stephen Fulton Jr. (born July 17, 1994) is an American professional boxer. He is the unified super bantamweight world champion, having held the WBO title since January 2021 and the WBC title since November 2021. He previously held the IBO super bantamweight title in 2019.

As of December 2021, he is ranked as the #1 junior featherweight by Transnational Boxing Rankings Board, The Ring, and Boxrec.

Professional boxing career

Early career
Fulton made his professional debut against the journeyman Issac Badger on October 14, 2014. He won the fight by a second-round technical knockout. Immediately after this victory, Fulton signed with Premier Boxing Champions. Over the course of the following five years, Fulton amassed a 15-0 record with 6 stoppage victories.

IBO super bantamweight champion

Fulton vs. Ambunda
Fulton was scheduled to challenge Paulus Ambunda for the IBO super bantamweight title on May 11, 2019 at the EagleBank Arena in Fairfax, Virginia, United States. Fulton dominated throughout the bout and scored a knockdown over the Namibian champion in the eight round. Although Fulton was unable to finish his opponent, he won the fight by a wide unanimous decision, with all three judges scoring the fight 120–107 in his favor.

Fulton vs. Avelar
Fulton moved up in weight for his next fight, as he was scheduled to face Isaac Avelar in a 124 lbs catchweight bout. The fight was set for August 24, 2019, at the Bert Ogden Arena in Edinburg, Texas, United States. Fulton won the fight with a body shot in the sixth round of the ten round bout. Fulton called for a title unification fight with either Brandon Figueroa or Daniel Roman in his post-fight interview, stating "...Figueroa does not want to fight me and if he does, he will get stopped in the mid rounds. If me and Danny Roman fight, it will be explosive but the same thing will happen, he will get stopped".

WBO super bantamweight champion

Fulton vs. Khegai
Fulton was scheduled to face the unbeaten Arnold Khegai on January 25, 2020 at the Barclays Center in New York City, United States. The fight was for the vacant WBO Inter-Continental super bantamweight belt, as well as the status of the WBO super bantamweight mandatory title challenger. Khegai took the center of the ring for the first four rounds, while Fulton remained passive and attempted to outfight. Fulton was more active from the fifth round onward, dictating the subsequent rounds. He won the fight by unanimous decision, with two judges awarding him a 117–111 scorecard, while the third judge scored the fight 116–112 in his favor.

Fulton vs. Leo
His victory against Khegai earned Fulton the right to challenge the reigning WBO champion Emanuel Navarrete. However, on July 11, 2020, Navarrete vacated the super bantamweight title in order to move up to featherweight. Fulton was scheduled to face Angelo Leo for the vacant WBO super bantamweight title on August 1, 2020. On July 29, 2020, Fulton and two members of his team tested positive for COVID-19, forcing him to withdraw from the title fight. Leo was rescheduled to face Tramaine Williams, whom he beat by unanimous decision. On December 20, 2020, it was announced that Angelo Leo would make the first defense of his WBO super bantamweight title against Fulton. The fight was scheduled as the main event of a triple-header set for January 23, 2021, at the Park Theater in Las Vegas, Nevada, United States. Leo appeared slower and less powerful than Fulton, who won almost every round of the bout. Fulton won the fight by unanimous decision, with scores of 118–110, 119–109 and 119–109.

Unified super bantamweight champion

Fulton vs. Figueroa
Fulton was scheduled to face the WBC super bantamweight titlist Brandon Figueroa in a title unification bout on September 18, 2021, at the Park Theater in Las Vegas, Nevada, United States. The fight was originally set for September 11, but was pushed back a week, as PBC required a new main event following the negotiation breakdown between Canelo Alvarez and Caleb Plant. The fight was once again postponed on September 8, as Figueroa tested positive for COVID-19. The fight was rescheduled for November 27, 2021. Fulton entered the bout as a -340 favorite to win the bout. Fulton won by twelve rounds majority decision, with scores of 114-114 and two 116-112's for him. Figueroa out-landed Fulton 314 to 269 in total punches, although Fulton was the more accurate boxer, landing 37% of his punches to Figueroa's 29.6%. The majority of media members scored the fight in Fulton's favor.

Fulton vs. Roman
It was revealed on March 6, 2022, that Fulton would make his first title defense as a unified champion against Daniel Roman, who was at the time the WBC mandatory super bantamweight title challenger, as well as the #1 ranked WBO super bantamweight contender. Fulton's first title defense as a unified champion headlined a Showtime broadcast card, which took place on 4 June 2022, at the Minneapolis Armory in Minneapolis, Minnesota. Fulton justified his role as the -550 betting favorite, as he won the fight by a wide unanimous decision in front of a sold out crowd of 4,695. Judges Mike Fitzgerald and Patrick Morley scored the fight 120–108 for Fulton, while judge Nathan Palmer awarded Fulton a 119–109 scorecard. He out-landed Roman 218 to 113 in total punches (with a 36% accuracy rate) and 112 to 68 in power punches (with a 46% accuracy rate). Fulton called out the WBA (Super) and IBF super bantamweight champion Murodjon Akhmadaliev in his post-fight interview, stating: "You already know what’s next. I want [Murodjon Akhmadaliev]. I got to finish this up".

Fulton vs. Inoue
On November 9, 2022, the WBC formally approved Fulton's petition to face Brandon Figueroa for the interim WBC featherweight championship. As the reigning featherweight champion Rey Vargas moved up in weight to contest the vacant super featherweight title, the interim title fight would have been promoted to undisputed, had Vargas stayed at a higher weight class. Fulton and Figueroa faced each other a year prior in a unified title bout, with Fulton winning by majority decision. The fight was expected to take place on February 25, 2023, at the Minneapolis Armory in Central, Minneapolis. On January 16, ESPN reported that Figueroa would instead face Mark Magsayo, as Fulton had entered into negotiations with the former three-division world champion Naoya Inoue. The fight is scheduled to take place at the Yokohama Arena in Yokohama, Japan on May 7, 2023, and will be Fulton's first fight outside of the United States.

Professional boxing record

See also
List of world super-bantamweight boxing champions

References

External links

1994 births
Living people
American male boxers
Super-bantamweight boxers
African-American boxers
Boxers from Philadelphia
World super-bantamweight boxing champions
International Boxing Organization champions
World Boxing Organization champions
World Boxing Council champions
21st-century African-American sportspeople